Blonville-sur-Mer (literally Blonville on Sea) is a commune in the Calvados department in the Normandy region in northwestern France. It is a seaside resort on the Côte Fleurie with a long sandy beach.

Transport
Blonville-sur-Mer is on the railway line from Deauville to Dives-sur-Mer. The station building (Blonville-Bénerville) is no longer open but train services operate year-round at weekends as well as on week days during the summer season.

Population

Notable people linked to the commune

Deaths 
 Jean Baud (1919-2012), founder of Leader Price.

Others 
 Robert Gangnat, representative of the society of dramatic authors. It was at his home that the publisher Gaston Gallimard first met Marcel Proust, in August 1908. 
 Vincent Bolloré, French businessman, bought a villa by the sea in 2008.
 The writer and member of the French Resistance René Hardy (1911-1987) lived here from 1974 to 1982 in a villa rented to a professor of medicine.

See also
Communes of the Calvados department

References

Communes of Calvados (department)
Calvados communes articles needing translation from French Wikipedia
Populated coastal places in France